Mazubon-e Olya (also Romanized as Māzūbon-e ‘Olyā; also known as Māzūbon) is a village in Katra Rural District, Nashta District, Tonekabon County, Mazandaran Province, Iran. At the 2006 census, its population was 548, in 162 families.

References 

Populated places in Tonekabon County